The Australian Swimming Championships is the national Swimming championships for Australia. They are organised by Swimming Australia and separate championships are held annually in both long course (50m) and short course (25m) pools. The two meets are the country's top domestic meet for their respective course.

The meet usually also double as a selection event for international competitions such as the: Olympics, Paralympics, World Championships, Commonwealth Games and Pan Pacific Championships. Some consider the meet the second-toughest domestic competition in the world, behind the USA's national championships.

The first edition of the championships was held in Sydney in January 1896 with events at the Natatorium, Sutherland Dock (Cockatoo Island) and on the Hawkesbury River.

The state that wins the most points at the championships is awarded the Kieran Shield, named in memory of Barney B. Kieran, a swimmer from New South Wales, who was a world record holder, and who died, aged 18, in 1905.

The 1990 Australian Swimming Championships saw events for para athletes added for the first time.

Editions

Long course

Short course

Championships records
See List of Australian Championships records in swimming

References

External links
 Swimming Australia

 
Swimming competitions in Australia
Seven Sport